Mullingar Golf Club is a private golf club located in County Westmeath, Ireland.

History
The club was originally called the Westmeath Golf Club when it was founded in 1894, and the first members played on what is described as "a small course" on the site of Mullingar Race Course. In 1903, the club moved to a nine-hole layout just north of Mullingar town and golf was only permitted in the winter months as the farmer who owned the land needed the use of it in the summer which resulted in a major drawback.

Land became available to the Golf Club at the Belvedere House Estate in 1934. The golf course architect, James Braid, was hired to design and oversee the construction of the course at Belvedere, which was opened for play in 1937. The course has been upgraded over recent years and a new short game facility was opened for play in 2017. The signature hole is the par 3 second hole measuring 209 yards with an elevated green guarded on three sides by deep bunkers.

Mullingar Golf Club members in 1963 organised a Scratch Cup competition. The Scratch Trophy competition is now accredited with the Bridgestone Points System, which has elevated its status as an Irish championship competition. Past winners include Joe Carr, the inaugural winner, Darren Clarke, Paul McGinley, Padraig Harrington, Shane Lowry and Rory McIllroy.

Mullingar Golf Club is a private members club. The club members volunteer to help manage the affairs of the club through participating in committees. The club employs full-time staff to manage the business and to maintain all the facilities.

References

Golf clubs and courses in the Republic of Ireland
Sports clubs in County Westmeath
Golf Club
1894 establishments in Ireland
Sports venues completed in 1894